Ramchand Kamboj is a member of the Haryana Legislative Assembly from the BJP representing the Rania Vidhan sabha Constituency in Haryana from 2014 to 2019. He joined Bharatiya Janata Party just before 2019 Haryana Legislative Assembly election.

References 

Living people
Members of the Haryana Legislative Assembly
Indian National Lok Dal politicians
People from Sirsa, Haryana
Year of birth missing (living people)
Bharatiya Janata Party politicians from Haryana